The Lover of Lies, also known as The Doubter or Philopseudes, is a frame story written by the Syrian satirist Lucian of Samosata. It is written in the Attic dialect of ancient Greek. It is primarily a work of satire making fun of people who believe in the supernatural. The book contains the earliest known version of the story of The Sorcerer's Apprentice.

Summary
The dialogue begins with a young man named Tychiades asking his friend Philokles why most people are so fond of lies. After a brief discussion, Tychiades goes on to narrate an occasion when he went to visit an elderly friend named Eukrates hoping to meet his other friend Leontichos. At Eukrates's house, he encounters a large group of guests who have recently gathered together due to Eukrates suddenly falling ill. When Tychiades remarks that the folk remedies the other guests are suggesting to help Eukrates get better will not work, they all laugh at him. They then try to persuade him to believe in various superstitions by telling him stories, which grow increasingly ridiculous as the conversation goes on.

See also
 A True Story

References

External links

The Lover of Lies, English translation by H. W. Fowler and F. G. Fowler

2nd-century novels
Ancient Greek novels
Frame stories
Satirical works
Works by Lucian